is a former Japanese football player.

Club statistics

References

External links

1981 births
Living people
Tokyo Gakugei University alumni
Association football people from Shimane Prefecture
Japanese footballers
J2 League players
Yokohama FC players
Giravanz Kitakyushu players
Association football forwards